Guoyuan Station is a station on the  of the Beijing Subway.

Station layout 
The station has 2 elevated side platforms.

Exits 
There are 2 exits, lettered A and B. Exit B is accessible.

See also
 Pingguoyuan station, another station

External links

Beijing Subway stations in Tongzhou District
Railway stations in China opened in 2003